Radhan railway station is  located in Taluka Mehar of District Dadu, Sindh Pakistan. This town has a population of 50,000 approx.

See also
 List of railway stations in Pakistan
 Pakistan Railways

References

Railway stations in Dadu District
Railway stations on Kotri–Attock Railway Line (ML 2)